Malthomethes is a genus of false soldier beetles in the family Omethidae, containing a single described species, Malthomethes oregonus.

References

Further reading

 

Elateroidea
Monotypic Elateriformia genera
Articles created by Qbugbot